The image stone at Tängelgårda,  Lärbro parish, Gotland, Sweden is decorated with a scene of warriors holding rings, one (possibly Odin) horsed, with Valknut symbols drawn beneath.

See also
Stora Hammars stones

External links
Photograph of Tängelgårda I - Historiska Museet (Swedish Museum of National Antiquities)

Rune- and picture stones on Gotland
Gotland